The Sixth Tunisia Plan was an economic development plan implemented by the government of President Habib Bourguiba from 1982 to 1986.

Critics derided the plan's failure to lower the unemployment rate, attributing the lack of available work to the global recession, excessive focus on capital investment programs, and the government's foreign debt.

See also
 Economy of Tunisia
 Third Tunisia Plan
 Fourth Tunisia Plan
 Ninth Tunisia Plan

References

Economic history of Tunisia